Bagatelle is a table game and the predecessor of the pinball machine.

Bagatelle may also refer to:

Music
 Bagatelle (band), an Irish rock band
 Bagatelle (music), a musical form
 Bagatelle (opera), an opéra-comique by Offenbach
 Bagatelles, Op. 119 (Beethoven)
 Bagatelles, Op. 126 (Beethoven)
 Bagatelles, Op. 33 (Beethoven)
 Bagatelles (Dvořák)

Other uses
 Bagatelle (literary technique), a literary tool
 Bagatelle (TV series)
 Bagatelle Plantation, listed on the National Register of Historic Places in Iberville Parish, Louisiana
 Bagatelle restaurant, a gourmet restaurant in Oslo, Norway
 Bagatelle, Dominica, a village in southeastern Dominica
 Bagatelle, a village in Tobago
 Bagatelle, a community in Diego Martin, Trinidad
 Château de Bagatelle, a castle in the Bois de Boulogne, Paris
 Parc Bagatelle, a theme park in Berck, France
 "Bagatelle", a science fiction short story by John Varley
 Bagatelle, the Edward H. Bennett House and Studio in Lake Forest, Illinois
 The Bagatelles, a collection of comics written and printed by Benjamin Franklin

See also